is a Japanese voice actress and singer affiliated with Aoni Production. She played Ayano in Lucky Star, Natsumi Murakami in Negima and Mio Naganohara in Nichijou. Her album, Moi, was illustrated by Ken Akamatsu. Aizawa performed theme songs for the variety show Gyōkai yōgo no kiso chishiki dan mitsu on'na gakuen (:ja:業界用語の基礎知識 壇蜜女学園).

Filmography

Anime series

Video games

Discography

Albums

Singles

Drama CD

References

External links
Official agency profile 

Mai Aizawa at Oricon 

Living people
Aoni Production voice actors
Japanese women pop singers
Japanese video game actresses
Japanese voice actresses
Singers from Tokyo
Voice actresses from Tokyo
Year of birth missing (living people)
21st-century Japanese actresses
21st-century Japanese women singers
21st-century Japanese singers